Triphora pulchris is a species of sea snail, a marine gastropod mollusk in the family Triphoridae.  The scientific name of the species was first validly published in 1863 by Gérard Paul Deshayes.

Disqtribution
This marine species occurs in the Indian Ocean off Réunion.

References

External links
 Deshayes, G. P. (1863). Catalogue des mollusques de l'île de la Réunion (Bourbon). Pp. 1-144. In Maillard, L. (Ed.) Notes sur l'Ile de la Réunion. Dentu, Paris

Triphoridae
Molluscs described in 1863